Astrit Myfit Bushati is a member of the Assembly of the Republic of Albania for the Democratic Party of Albania. Bushati is also a member of the committee on Legal Affairs, Public Administration and Human Rights.

Background
Bushati was born in Shkodër and graduated from the faculty of Law at the University of Tirana. He joined the Democratic Party of Albania in 1991, and has been party leader in Shkodër since 2005. He served as a member of the City Council of Shkodër from 1996 until 2001.

Political activity
Bushati has the following political history:
1991–present: Member of the Democratic Party
1996–2001: Member of Municipal Council, Shkodër
1997–2001: Chairman of the Democratic Party, Shkodër
1998–2001: Member of National Council and the Presidency of the Democratic Party
2005–present: DP chairman, Shkodra
2005–present: Member of Albanian Parliament

Timeline

References

Living people
Democratic Party of Albania politicians
1962 births
Articles which contain graphical timelines
Members of the Parliament of Albania
People from Shkodër
21st-century Albanian politicians